Deeping St Nicholas is a village near Spalding in Lincolnshire, England, on the A1175 road between The Deepings and Spalding.  Unlike Market Deeping, which is in South Kesteven district, Deeping St Nicholas is in South Holland.

Deeping St Nicholas is also a South Holland civil parish which includes the small settlements of Tongue End and Hop Pole, and a number of outlying farms.  Its population at the 2011 census was 1,961.

Village
The village has a 19th-century stone church, the parish church of St Nicholas. The ecclesiastical parish is part of the Elloe West Deanery of the Diocese of Lincoln.  There is no incumbent.  It is part of the South Lincolnshire Circuit of the Methodist Church

The whole civil parish falls within the drainage area of the Welland and Deepings Internal Drainage Board.

At the Western end of the village is a level crossing for the Lincoln - Peterborough railway line, the site of the former Littleworth railway station.  The goods shed there was used for agricultural produce, including transshipment from the narrow gauge potato railway that also crossed the road.

A Primary School opened on 2 January 1877 with a roll of 5 under a Mr Hanley.  The current head teacher, Mr Tom Emery, oversees over 50 children.

History
In the 1086 Domesday Book, the village is written as "Estdeping".

From John Marius Wilson's 1872 Imperial Gazetteer of England and Wales:
DEEPING FEN, a fen and a chapelry in Bourn district, Lincoln. The fen lies on the North Drove and the South Drove drains, between Market-Deeping and Spalding; and comprises upwards of 30,000 acres. About one-half consists of enclosed commons, included in parishes; and the rest is extra-parochial. The chapelry comprises the extra-parochial part; was constituted in 1846; bears the alternative name of Deeping-St. Nicholas; lies adjacent to North Drove railway station, and 5 miles WSW of Spalding; and has a post office, of the name of Deeping-St. Nicholas, under Spalding. Acres, 16, 290. Real property, £27, 681. Pop., 1, 180. Houses, 184. The living is a vicarage in the diocese of Lincoln. Value, £210. Patrons, the Trustees of the late W. Stevenson, Esq. The church was built in 1846.
The Church of St Nicholas was built in 1846, in, nominally, the ecclesiastical parish of Deeping St Nicholas (the civil parish came into existence on 30 June 1856).  In practical terms, the church became a temporary chapel-of-ease since Deeping St Nicholas was at first administered spiritually as a chapelry of St John's Spalding.  In 1852 the chapelry was disbanded and the (ecclesiastical) parish became fully operational when the first incumbent vicar, Revd. Lewis E M Barnwell, was inducted and installed. The church was built by Charles Kirk, an architect from Sleaford, in Decorated style common in older surrounding churches.

Businesses
Most employment remains in agriculture. Other businesses are:
 D. Steele (farming)
 Vine House farm shop
 J. A. Watts (Mareham) Ltd (farming)
 J. Woodhead (farming)

References

External links

Villages in Lincolnshire
The Deepings
Civil parishes in Lincolnshire
Wind farms in England
South Holland, Lincolnshire